Cabinet of Bohuslav Sobotka was the governing body of the Czech Republic from 2014 to 2017. Bohuslav Sobotka was designated Prime Minister by President Miloš Zeman on January 17, 2014. The cabinet was sworn in on January 29, 2014. It was replaced by Andrej Babiš' Cabinet in December 2017.

The members of the government were Czech Social Democratic Party (ČSSD), ANO 2011 (ANO) and Christian and Democratic Union – Czechoslovak People's Party (KDU-ČSL) as coalition agreement with 8 senior ministers from ČSSD, 6 from ANO and 3 from KDU-ČSL.

Government ministers

References 

Czech government cabinets
2014 establishments in the Czech Republic
Cabinets established in 2014
Czech Social Democratic Party
KDU-ČSL
ANO 2011
Cabinets disestablished in 2017
Coalition governments of the Czech Republic
2013 Czech legislative election